Horace Addison Tenney (February 22, 1820March 13, 1906) was an American lawyer, newspaper editor, and Republican politician.  He served one term in the Wisconsin State Assembly, representing north-central Dane County, and was a regent of the University of Wisconsin.

Biography

Born in Grand Isle, Vermont, Tenney moved with his parents to Elyria, Ohio in 1833. In 1841, Tenney was admitted to the Ohio bar and practiced law. In 1842, he started the Elyria Lorain Republican newspaper. Then, in 1843, Tenney was elected prosecuting attorney of Lorain County, Ohio. Tenney moved to Galena, Illinois in 1845 and started the Galena Jeffersonian newspaper with his brother.

He moved to Madison, Wisconsin Territory, in 1846 and was co-owner of the Wisconsin Argus newspaper. Tenney was the Wisconsin territorial printer in 1846 and 1847, and was the reporter of the two Wisconsin Constitutional Conventions. He was also the Wisconsin assistant state geologist. He served in the Wisconsin State Assembly in 1857 as a Republican. Tenney served as president of the Village of Madison in 1853 and 1854. He was a regent of the University of Wisconsin. During the American Civil War, Tenney was paymaster for the Union Army. He was in charge of the United States Mail for Wisconsin, Iowa, Minnesota, and the Dakota Territory. During the 1870s, he was involved with the editorial staff of some Chicago newspapers. In the United States election of 1878, Tenney ran for the United States House of Representatives in Wisconsin's 2nd congressional district on the Greenback Party ticket. He died in Madison.

Published works

References

External links
 

1820 births
1906 deaths
People from Grand Isle, Vermont
People from Elyria, Ohio
People from Galena, Illinois
Politicians from Madison, Wisconsin
People of Wisconsin in the American Civil War
Editors of Wisconsin newspapers
Ohio lawyers
Wisconsin lawyers
Wisconsin Greenbacks
19th-century American politicians
Mayors of places in Wisconsin
County district attorneys in Ohio
Republican Party members of the Wisconsin State Assembly
Journalists from Ohio
Journalists from Illinois
Lawyers from Madison, Wisconsin